The list of sponges of South Africa is a list of species that form a part of the poriferan (Phylum Porifera) fauna of South Africa. Taxonomy follows WoRMS. The list follows the SANBI listing on iNaturalist, and does not always agree with WoRMS for distribution.

Class Calcarea

Subclass Calcaronea

Order Leucosolenida

Family Grantiidae
 
Amphiute lepadiformis Borojevic, 1967
Aphroceras alcicornis 	Gray, 1858, syn. Leucandra alcicornis (Gray, 1858), Cyathiscus actinia Haeckel, 1869.
Leucandra algoaensis (Bowerbank, 1864), syn, Leucogypsia algoaensis Bowerbank, 1864.
Leucandra armata (Urban, 1908), syn. Leuconia armata Urban, 1908.
Leucandra australiensis (Carter, 1886), syn. Leuconia australiensis Carter, 1886. 		
Leucandra bleeki (Haeckel, 1872), syn. Leucaltis bleeki Haeckel, 1872.
Leucandra hentschelii Brøndsted, 1931, syn.Leuconia hentschelii (Brøndsted, 1931),
Leucandra spissa (Urban, 1909), syn. Leuconia spissa Urban, 1909.

Family Amphoriscidae
 
Amphoriscus kryptoraphis Urban, 1908
Leucilla capsula (Haeckel, 1870), syn. Lipostomella capsula Haeckel, 1870.

Family Heteropiidae
 
Grantessa ramosa (Haeckel, 1872), syn. Grantia ramosa Smith in Haeckel, 1872, Leuckartea natalensis Miklucho-Maclay in Haeckel, 1872, Sycandra ramosa Haeckel, 1872, Sycandra ramosa Haeckel, 1872.
Grantessa rarispinosa 	Borojevic, 1967						
Grantia socialis Borojevic, 1967
Heteropia glomerosa (Bowerbank, 1873), syn. Sycettusa glomerosa (Bowerbank, 1873), Leuconia glomerosa Bowerbank, 1873, Heteropia simplex Row in Dendy & Row, 1913.
Sycettusa hastifera (Row, 1909), syn. Grantilla hastifera Row, 1909.

Family Leucosoleniidae
 
Leucosolenia botryoides (Ellis & Solander, 1786), syn. Spongia botryoides Ellis & Solander, 1786, orange pipe sponge. 
Leucosolenia eustephana Haeckel, 1872

Family Sycettidae
 
Sycon defendens Borojevic, 1967						
Sycon dunstervillia (Haeckel, 1872), syn. Sycandra dunstervillia Haeckel, 1872.
Sycon lunulatum (Haeckel, 1872), syn. Leucandra lunulata Haeckel, 1872, Leuconia lunulata (Haeckel, 1872).
Sycon natalense Borojevic, 1967

Subclass Calcinea

Order Clathrinida

Family Clathrinidae
 
Ascaltis gardineri (Dendy, 1913), syn. Clathrina gardineri (Dendy, 1913),Leucosolenia gardineri Dendy, 1913, Leucosolenia gardineri var. vergensis Kumar, 1924.
Ernsta cordata (Haeckel, 1872), syn. Ascandra cordata Haeckel, 1872, Clathrina cordata (Haeckel, 1872), Leucosolenia cordata (Haeckel, 1872).

Family Leucettidae
 
Leucetta trigona Haeckel, 1872

Class Demospongiae

Subclass Heteroscleromorpha

Order Agelasida

Family Agelasidae
 
Agelas mauritiana var. oxeata Lévi, 1961 Pocked cup sponge

Order Axinellida

Family Axinellidae
 
Axinella natalensis (Kirkpatrick, 1903), syn. Tragosia infundibuliformis var. natalensis Kirkpatrick, 1903.						
Axinella weltnerii (Lendenfeld, 1897), syn. Phacellia weltnerii Lendenfeld, 1897. Crumpled sponge

Family Stelligeridae
 
Higginsia bidentifera (Ridley & Dendy, 1886)
Higginsia natalensis Carter, 1885, syn. Higginsia coralloides var. natalensis Carter, 1885,

Family Raspailiidae
 
Subfamily Raspailiinae
Aulospongus involutus (Kirkpatrick, 1903), syn. Hemectyonilla involuta (Kirkpatrick, 1903), Stylostichon involutum Kirkpatrick, 1903.
Endectyon gorgonioides (Kirkpatrick, 1903), syn. Syringella gorgonioides Kirkpatrick, 1903.
Raspailia rigida Ridley & Dendy, 1886

Subfamily Cyamoninae
Waltherarndtia caliculatum (Kirkpatrick, 1903), syn. Hymeniacidon caliculatum var. osculatum Kirkpatrick, 1903, Hymeniacidon caliculatum Kirkpatrick, 1903.

Order Biemnida

Family Biemnidae
 
Biemna anisotoxa Lévi, 1963 yellow encrusting sponge. 
Biemna megalosigma var. sigmodragma Lévi, 1963
Biemna pedonculata Lévi, 1963
Biemna polyphylla Lévi, 1963				
Biemna rhabdostyla Uriz, 1988
Sigmaxinella arborea Kirkpatrick, 1903
Sigmaxinella incrustans Kirkpatrick, 1903

Order Bubarida

Family Desmanthidae
 
Petromica (Petromica) digitata (Burton, 1929), syn. Petromica digitata (Burton, 1929), Monanthus plumosus var. digitatus Burton, 1929, Monanthus digitatus Burton, 1929.
Petromica (Petromica) plumosa Kirkpatrick, 1903, syn. Petromica plumosa Kirkpatrick, 1903, Monanthus plumosus Kirkpatrick, 1903.
Petromica (Petromica) tubulata (Kirkpatrick, 1903), syn.Petromica tubulata (Kirkpatrick, 1903),Monanthus plumosus var. tubulatus Kirkpatrick, 1903.

Order Clionaida

Family Clionaidae
 
Cliona celata Grant, 1826, syn. complicated, see citation. boring sponge.
Spheciospongia capensis (Carter, 1882), syn. Suberites capensis Carter, 1882.
Spheciospongia vagabunda (Ridley, 1884), syn. Anthosigmella vagabunda Ridley, 1884, Spirastrella cylindrica Kieschnick, 1896, Spirastrella vagabunda Ridley, 1884, Spirastrella vagabunda Ridley, 1884. vagabond sponge.

Family Placospongiidae
 
Placospongia carinata (Bowerbank, 1858), syn. Geodia carinata Bowerbank, 1858.
Placospongia melobesioides Gray, 1867

Order Haplosclerida

Family Callyspongiidae
 
Callyspongia confoederata (sensu Ridley, 1884), syn.Spinosella confoederata (Ridley, 1884), Tuba confoederata sensu Ridley, 1884. Spiky tube sponge				
Callyspongia hospitalis (Stephens, 1915), syn. Pachychalina hospitalis Stephens, 1915.
Callyspongia (Callyspongia) tubulosa (Esper, 1797), syn. Spongia tubulosa sensu Esper, 1797, Siphonochalina tubulosa (Esper, 1797), Phylosiphonia (Anatoxius) tenuispina Lendenfeld, 1887, Phylosiphonia (Anatoxius) pumila Lendenfeld, 1887, Callyspongia tubulosa sensu (Esper, 1797).

Family Chalinidae
 
Haliclona (Haliclona) anonyma (Stephens, 1915), syn. Haliclona anonyma (Stephens, 1915), Siphonochalina anonyma Stephens, 1915. Tubular fan sponge					
Haliclona bawiana (Lendenfeld, 1897)
Haliclona (Reniera) ciocalyptoides Burton, 1933, syn. Haliclona ciocalyptoides Burton, 1933.
Haliclona (Gellius) flagellifera (Ridley & Dendy, 1886), syn. Haliclona flagellifera (Ridley & Dendy, 1886), Gellius flagellifer Ridley & Dendy, 1886, Adocia flagellifera (Ridley & Dendy, 1887), Hemigellius flagellifer (Ridley & Dendy, 1886), Sigmadocia flagellifera (Ridley & Dendy, 1886).						
Haliclona (Soestella) implexa (Schmidt, 1868), syn. Haliclona implexa (Schmidt, 1868), Reniera implexa Schmidt, 1868.
Haliclona saldanhae (Stephens, 1915), syn. Reniera saldanhae Stephens, 1915.
Haliclona simplicissima (Burton, 1933), syn. Adocia simplicissima Burton, 1933,
Haliclona (Haliclona) stilensis Burton, 1933, syn. Haliclona stilensis Burton, 1933.
Haliclona submonilifera Uriz, 1988 Bubble bead sponge
Haliclona tulearensis Vacelet, Vasseur & Lévi, 1976

Family Petrosiidae
 
Petrosia (Strongylophora) vulcaniensis Samaai & Gibbons, 2005, syn. Petrosia vulcaniensis Samaai & Gibbons, 2005.

Family Phloeodictyidae
 
Oceanapia eumitum (Kirkpatrick, 1903), syn. Phloeodictyon eumitum Kirkpatrick, 1903.
Oceanapia seychellensis (Dendy, 1922), syn. Phloeodictyon seychellense Dendy, 1922. Chimneyed football sponge

Order Merliida

Family Hamacanthidae
 
Hamacantha (Vomerula) esperioides Ridley & Dendy, 1886 Fibrous sponge
Hamacantha (Vomerula) papillata Vosmaer, 1885, syn. Hamacantha papillata Vosmaer, 1885.

Order Poecilosclerida

Family Acarnidae
 
Acarnus claudei van Soest, Hooper & Hiemstra, 1991
Iophon cheliferum Ridley & Dendy, 1886, syn. Iophon chelifer Ridley & Dendy, 1886.
Paracornulum coherens Lévi, 1963

Family Chondropsidae
 
Psammoclema inordinatum (Kirkpatrick, 1903), syn. Psammopemma inordinatum Kirkpatrick, 1903.

Family Cladorhizidae
 
Cladorhiza ephyrula Lévi, 1964

Family Coelosphaeridae
 
Coelosphaera (Coelosphaera) navicelligera (Ridley, 1885), syn. Siderodermella navicelligera (Ridley, 1885), Coelosphaera navicelligera (Ridley, 1884), Crella navicelligera Ridley, 1885.
Forcepia (Forcepia) agglutinans Burton, 1933, syn. Forcepia agglutinans Burton, 1933.
Forcepia (Leptolabis) australis (Lévi, 1963), syn. Trachyforcepia australis Lévi, 1963.
Histodermella natalensis (Kirkpatrick, 1903), syn. Coelosphaera (Coelosphaera) natalensis (Kirkpatrick, 1903), Histoderma natalensis Kirkpatrick, 1903.
Inflatella belli (Kirkpatrick, 1907) Gooseberry sponge
Lissodendoryx (Anomodoryx) coralgardeniensis Samaai & Gibbons, 2005, syn. Lissodendoryx coralgardeniensis Samaai & Gibbons, 2005.
Lissodendoryx (Ectyodoryx) arenaria Burton, 1936, syn. Lissodendoryx arenaria Burton, 1936.
Lissodendoryx (Lissodendoryx) areolata Lévi, 1963, syn. Lissodendoryx (Lissodendoryx) areolata Lévi, 1963	Lissodendoryx (Lissodendoryx) areolata Lévi, 1963.
Lissodendoryx (Lissodendoryx) digitata (Ridley & Dendy, 1886), syn. Myxilla digitata Ridley & Dendy, 1886, Lissodendoryx digitata (Ridley & Dendy, 1886).
Lissodendoryx (Lissodendoryx) isodictyalis (Carter, 1882), syn. Halichondria isodictyalis Carter, 1882.		
Lissodendoryx (Lissodendoryx) simplex (Baer, 1906), syn. Dendoryx simplex Baer, 1906, Myxilla (Myxilla) simplex (Baer, 1906), Myxilla simplex (Baer, 1906).
Lissodendoryx (Lissodendoryx) stephensoni Burton, 1936, syn. Lissodendoryx stephensoni Burton, 1936.
Lissodendoryx (Lissodendoryx) ternatensis (Thiele, 1903), syn. Hamigera ternatensis Thiele, 1903, Lissodendoryx sinensis Brøndsted, 1929, Lissodendoryx ternatensis (Thiele, 1903).

Family Crambeidae
 
Crambe acuata (Lévi, 1958), syn. Crambe chelastra Lévi, 1960, Folitispa acuata Lévi, 1958. Stellar sponge
Lithochela conica Burton, 1929

Family Crellidae
 
Crella caespes (Ehlers, 1870), syn.Clathria (Clathria) caespes (Ehlers, 1870), Scopalina caespes Ehlers, 1870.
Crella (Grayella) erecta Lévi, 1963, syn. Crella erecta Lévi, 1963.

Family Dendoricellidae
 
Fibulia ramosa (Ridley & Dendy, 1886), syn. Desmacidon ramosa Ridley & Dendy, 1886, Isodictya ramosa (Ridley & Dendy, 1886), Plumocolumella ramosa (Ridley & Dendy, 1886). columnar sponge

Family Esperiopsidae
 
Amphilectus informis (Stephens, 1915), syn. Esperiopsis informis Stephens, 1915.
Esperiopsis papillata (Vosmaer, 1880), syn. Amphilectus papillatus Vosmaer, 1880.

Family Guitarridae
Tetrapocillon novaezealandiae Brøndsted, 1924

Family Hymedesmiidae
Hymedesmia (Hymedesmia) aurantiaca Lévi, 1963, syn. Hymedesmia aurantiaca Lévi, 1963,
Hymedesmia (Hymedesmia) parva Stephens, 1915, syn, Hymedesmia parva Stephens, 1915,
Phorbas clathratus (Lévi, 1963), syn, Pronax clathrata Lévi, 1963,
Phorbas dayi (Lévi, 1963), syn. Anchinoe dayi Lévi, 1963,
Phorbas fibrosus (Lévi, 1963), syn. Pronax fibrosa Lévi, 1963,
Phorbas lamellatus (Lévi, 1963), syn. Pronax lamellata Lévi, 1963,
Phorbas mollis (Kirkpatrick, 1903), syn. Clathria mollis Kirkpatrick, 1903,
Phorbas pustulosus (Carter, 1882), syn. Pronax pustulosa (Carter, 1882), Halichondria pustulosa Carter, 1882, Clathria (Microciona) pustulosa (Carter, 1882), Anaata pustulosa (Carter, 1882), Baseball glove sponge 
Plocamionida ambigua (Bowerbank, 1866), syn. Microciona ambigua Bowerbank, 1866, Plocamia lundbecki (Breitfuss, 1912), Plocamia ambigua (Bowerbank, 1866), Myxilla lundbecki Breitfuss, 1912,  Hymedesmia indistincta Bowerbank, 1874, Hastatus ambiguus (Bowerbank, 1866), Antho lundbecki (Breitfuss, 1912)

Family Iotrochotidae
 
Iotrochota purpurea (Bowerbank, 1875), syn, Spongia foveolaria Lamarck, 1814, Halichondria purpurea Bowerbank, 1875, Chondrocladia sessilis Kieschnick, 1900, Chondrocladia ramosa Kieschnick, 1900, Chondrocladia dura Kieschnick, 1900.

Family Isodictyidae
 
Isodictya alata (Stephens, 1915), syn. Homoeodictya alata Stephens, 1915.
Isodictya compressa (Esper, 1794), syn. Spongia pannea Lamarck, 1814, Spongia compressa Esper, 1794, Homoeodictya compressa (Esper, 1794).
Isodictya conulosa (Ridley & Dendy, 1886), syn. Homoeodictya conulosa (Ridley & Dendy, 1886), Desmacidon conulosum Ridley & Dendy, 1886.
Isodictya ectofibrosa (Lévi, 1963), syn. Desmacidon ectofibrosa Lévi, 1963, Fibulia ectyofibrosa (Lévi, 1963).
Isodictya elastica (Vosmaer, 1880), syn. Homoeodictya elastica (Vosmaer, 1880), Desmacidon elastica Vosmaer, 1880.					
Isodictya foliata (Carter, 1885), syn. Textiliforma foliata Carter, 1885.
Isodictya frondosa (Lévi, 1963), syn. Homoeodictya frondosa Lévi, 1963. Fanned kelp sponge 
Isodictya grandis (Ridley & Dendy, 1886), syn. Homoeodictya grandis Ridley & Dendy, 1886, Desmacidon (Homoeodictya) grandis (Ridley & Dendy, 1886).
Isodictya multiformis (Stephens, 1915), syn. Homoeodictya multiformis Stephens, 1915.

Family Latrunculiidae
 
Cyclacanthia bellae (Samaai, Gibbons, Kelly & Davies-Coleman, 2003), syn. Latrunculia bellae Samaai, Gibbons, Kelly & Davies-Coleman, 2003.
Cyclacanthia cloverlyae Samaai, Govender & Kelly, 2004
Cyclacanthia mzimayiensis Samaai, Govender & Kelly, 2004
Latrunculia (Latrunculia) biformis Kirkpatrick, 1907, syn. Latrunculia biformis Kirkpatrick, 1907, Latrunculia apicalis var. biformis Kirkpatrick, 1907. Mud-clump sponge
Latrunculia (Biannulata) lunaviridis Samaai, Gibbons, Kelly & Davies-Coleman, 2003, syn.Latrunculia  lunaviridis Samaai, Gibbons, Kelly & Davies-Coleman, 2003. Green moon sponge
Latrunculia (Biannulata) microacanthoxea Samaai, Gibbons, Kelly & Davies-Coleman, 2003, syn, Latrunculia microacanthoxea Samaai, Gibbons, Kelly & Davies-Coleman, 2003.
Latrunculia (Biannulata) spinispiraefera Brøndsted, 1924, syn. Spirastrella spinispiraefera (Brøndsted, 1924), Latrunculia spinispiraefera Brøndsted, 1924. Vented sponge
Strongylodesma algoaensis Samaai, Gibbons, Kelly & Davies-Coleman, 2003
Strongylodesma aliwaliensis Samaai, Keyzers & Davies-Coleman, 2004
Strongylodesma tsitsikammaensis Samaai, Gibbons, Kelly & Davies-Coleman, 2003
Tsitsikamma favus Samaai & Kelly, 2002
Tsitsikamma pedunculata Samaai, Gibbons, Kelly & Davies-Coleman, 2003						
Tsitsikamma scurra Samaai, Gibbons, Kelly & Davies-Coleman, 2003

Family Microcionidae
 
Subfamily Microcioninae
Clathria (Clathria) axociona Lévi, 1963, syn. Clathria axociona Lévi, 1963.
Clathria (Axosuberites) benguelaensis Samaai & Gibbons, 2005, syn. Clathria benguelaensis Samaai & Gibbons, 2005.				
Clathria (Thalysias) cactiformis (Lamarck, 1814), syn. Spongia cactiformis Lamarck, 1814 and many others.
Clathria (Clathria) conica Lévi, 1963, syn. Clathria conica Lévi, 1963.
Clathria (Thalysias) cullingworthi Burton, 1931, syn. Clathria cullingworthi Burton, 1931.
Clathria (Clathria) dayi Lévi, 1963, syn. Clathria dayi Lévi, 1963.
Clathria (Thalysias) delaubenfelsi (Lévi, 1963), syn. Clathria delaubenfelsi (Lévi, 1963), Rhaphidophlus delaubenfelsi Lévi, 1963.
Clathria (Clathria) elastica Lévi, 1963, syn. Clathria (Clathria) elastica Lévi, 1963.
Clathria (Thalysias) flabellata (Burton, 1936), syn. Clathria (Clathria) flabellata (Burton, 1936), Clathria flabellata (Burton, 1936), Rhaphidophlus flabellata Burton 1936.
Clathria (Clathria) hexagonopora Lévi, 1963, syn. Clathria hexagonopora Lévi, 1963.
Clathria (Thalysias) hooperi Samaai & Gibbons, 2005, syn.Clathria hooperi Samaai & Gibbons, 2005. Nodular sponge
Clathria (Thalysias) lissoclada (Burton, 1934), syn. Rhaphidophlus lissocladus Burton, 1934, Clathria lissoclada (Burton, 1934). Triangular blade sponge
Clathria (Clathria) lobata Vosmaer, 1880, syn. Clathria lobata Vosmaer, 1880 and others.
Clathria (Thalysias) nervosa (Lévi, 1963), syn. Clathria nervosa (Lévi, 1963), Axociella nervosa Lévi, 1963.
Clathria (Clathria) omegiensis Samaai & Gibbons, 2005, syn. Clathria omegiensis Samaai & Gibbons, 2005.
Clathria (Isociella) oudekraalensis Samaai & Gibbons, 2005, syn. Clathria oudekraalensis Samaai & Gibbons, 2005.
Clathria (Thalysias) oxitoxa Lévi, 1963, syn. Clathria oxitoxa Lévi, 1963.
Clathria (Clathria) pachystyla Lévi, 1963, syn. Clathria pachystyla Lévi, 1963. Orange finger sponge
Clathria (Clathria) parva Lévi, 1963, syn. Clathria (Axosuberites) parva Lévi, 1963, 'Clathria parva Lévi, 1963.
Clathria (Clathria) rhaphidotoxa Stephens, 1915, syn. Clathria  rhaphidotoxa Stephens, 1915.
Clathria (Microciona) similis (Thiele, 1903), syn. Clathria similis (Thiele, 1903), Hymeraphia similis Thiele, 1903, Microciona similis (Thiele, 1903).
Clathria (Microciona) stephensae Hooper, 1996, syn.Axocielita similis (Stephens, 1915), Clathria stephensae Hooper, 1996, Microciona similis Stephens, 1915.
Clathria (Clathria) zoanthifera Lévi, 1963

Subfamily Ophlitaspongiinae
Antho (Antho) dichotoma  (Linnaeus, 1767), syn. various.
Antho (Antho) involvens (Schmidt, 1864), syn. various.
Antho (Acarnia) kellyae Samaai & Gibbons, 2005, syn. Antho kellyae Samaai & Gibbons, 2005.
Antho (Acarnia) prima (Brøndsted, 1924) Orange fan sponge
Subfamily Ophlitaspongiinae
Artemisina vulcani Lévi, 1963
Echinoclathria dichotoma (Lévi, 1963), syn. Ophlitaspongia dichotoma Lévi, 1963. Tree sponge, Orange tree sponge

Family Mycalidae
 
Mycale (Aegogropila) meridionalis Lévi, 1963, syn. Mycale meridionalis Lévi, 1963.
Mycale (Aegogropila) simonis (Ridley & Dendy, 1886), syn. Mycale simonis (Ridley & Dendy, 1886), Esperella simonis Ridley & Dendy, 1886.
Mycale (Aegogropila) tapetum Samaai & Gibbons, 2005, syn. Mycale  tapetum Samaai & Gibbons, 2005.
Mycale (Carmia) macilenta (Bowerbank, 1866), syn. Hymeniacidon macilenta Bowerbank, 1866.
Mycale (Carmia) phyllophila Hentschel, 1911, syn. Mycale phyllophila Hentschel, 1911.
Mycale (Carmia) pulvinus Samaai & Gibbons, 2005, syn. Mycale pulvinus Samaai & Gibbons, 2005.
Mycale (Mycale) anisochela Lévi, 1963, syn, Mycale anisochela Lévi, 1963. Brain sponge
Mycale (Mycale) sulcata Hentschel, 1911, syn. Mycale sulcata Hentschel, 1911, Mycale sulcata var. minor Hentschel, 1911.
Mycale (Mycale) trichela Lévi, 1963, syn. Mycale trichela Lévi, 1963.
Mycale (Oxymycale) stephensae Samaai & Gibbons, 2005, syn. Mycale stephensae Samaai & Gibbons, 2005.
Mycale (Paresperella) atlantica (Stephens, 1917), syn. Paresperella atlantica Stephens, 1917, Mycale atlantica (Stephens, 1917).						
Mycale (Paresperella) levii (Uriz, 1987), syn. Mycale levii (Uriz, 1987), Paresperella atlantica sensu Lévi, 1963.
Mycale (Paresperella) toxifera (Lévi, 1963), syn. Mycale toxifera (Lévi, 1963).
Mycale (Zygomycale) parishii (Bowerbank, 1875), syn. Raphiodesma parishii Bowerbank, 1875, Zygomycale parishii (Bowerbank, 1875).

Family Myxillidae
 
Ectyonopsis flabellata	(Lévi, 1963), syn. Ectyonancora flabellata Lévi, 1963.
Ectyonopsis pluridentata (Lévi, 1963), syn. Ectyonancora pluridentata Lévi, 1963. Fused branch sponge
Hymenancora tenuissima (Thiele, 1905), syn. Ectyomyxilla tenuissima (Thiele, 1905), Hymedesmia tenuissima Thiele, 1905, Jelissima tenuissima (Thiele, 1905).
Myxilla (Myxilla) fimbriata (Bowerbank, 1866), syn. Isodictya fimbriata Bowerbank, 1866, Myxilla fimbriata (Bowerbank, 1866).
Myxilla (Myxilla) incrustans (Johnston, 1842)
Myxilla (Ectyomyxilla) kerguelensis (Hentschel, 1914), syn. Myxilla kerguelensis (Hentschel, 1914) , Ectyomyxilla kerguelensis Hentschel, 1914.
Myxilla (Burtonanchora) sigmatifera (Lévi, 1963), syn, Myxilla sigmatifera (Lévi, 1963),  Burtonanchora sigmatifera Lévi, 1963.

Family Podospongiidae

Podospongia natalensis (Kirkpatrick, 1903), syn. Latrunculia natalensis Kirkpatrick, 1903.

Family Tedaniidae
 
Tedania (Tedania) anhelans (Vio in Olivi, 1792) Chilli pepper sponge
Tedania (Tedania) brondstedi Burton, 1936, syn. Tedania brondstedi Burton, 1936.
Tedania (Tedania) scotiae Stephens, 1915, syn. Tedania scotiae Stephens, 1915.
Tedania (Tedania) stylonychaeta Lévi, 1963, syn. Tedania stylonychaeta Lévi, 1963.
Tedania (Tedania) tubulifera Lévi, 1963, syn. Tedania tubulifera Lévi, 1963.

Order Polymastiida

Family Polymastiidae

Polymastia atlantica Samaai & Gibbons, 2005 Atlantic teat sponge 
Polymastia bouryesnaultae Samaai & Gibbons, 2005 Knobbly sponge
Polymastia disclera Lévi, 1964
Polymastia littoralis Stephens, 1915
Polymastia mamillaris (Müller, 1806), syn, Spongia mamillaris Müller, 1806.
Proteleia sollasi Dendy & Ridley, 1886

Order Spongillida

Family Spongillidae
 
Corvospongilla zambesiana (Kirkpatrick, 1906) syn. Spongilla zambesiana Kirkpatrick, 1906  Freshwater 
Ephydatia fluviatilis capensis Kirkpatrick, 1907
Eunapius fragilis (Leidy, 1851) syn. Spongilla fragilis Leidy, 1851 and various others  Freshwater 		
Eunapius michaelseni (Annandale, 1914) syn. Spongilla michaelseni Annandale, 1914 Freshwater			
Eunapius nitens (Carter, 1881) syn. Spongilla nitens Carter, 1881 Freshwater, 
Radiospongilla cerebellata (Bowerbank, 1863)
Stratospongilla bombayensis (Carter, 1882), syn. Spongilla bombayensis Carter, 1882.

Order Suberitida

Family Halichondriidae

Amorphinopsis fenestrata (Ridley, 1884), syn. Suberites oculatus Kieschnick, 1896, Prostylissa oculata (Kieschnick, 1896), Leucophloeus fenestratus Ridley, 1884, Ciocalypta oscitans Hooper, Cook, Hobbs & Kennedy, 1997, Ciocalypta oculata var. maxima Hentschel, 1912, Ciocalypta oculata (Kieschnick, 1896), Ciocalypta fenestrata (Ridley, 1884), Ciocalypta confossa Hooper, Cook, Hobbs & Kennedy, 1997, Amorphinopsis oculata var. maxima (Hentschel, 1912), Amorphinopsis oculata (Kieschnick, 1896).
Axinyssa tethyoides Kirkpatrick, 1903, syn. Pseudaxinyssa tethyoides (Kirkpatrick, 1903).
Ciocalypta alleni de Laubenfels, 1936
Halichondria (Halichondria) capensis Samaai & Gibbons, 2005, syn. Halichondria capensis Samaai & Gibbons, 2005.
Halichondria (Halichondria) gilvus Samaai & Gibbons, 2005, syn. Halichondria gilvus Samaai & Gibbons, 2005.
Halichondria (Halichondria) panicea (Pallas, 1766), syn. Spongia panicea Pallas, 1766,  plus very large number of others.
Hymeniacidon kerguelensis var. capensis Hentschel, 1914
Hymeniacidon stylifera (Stephens, 1915)
Hymeniacidon sublittoralis Samaai & Gibbons, 2005
Topsentia pachastrelloides (Topsent, 1892), syn. Spongosorites pachastrelloides (Topsent, 1892), Halichondria pachastrelloides Topsent, 1892.

Family Suberitidae
	
Aaptos alphiensis Samaai & Gibbons, 2005 					
Aaptos nuda (Kirkpatrick, 1903), syn. Trachya nuda Kirkpatrick, 1903.
Homaxinella flagelliformis (Ridley & Dendy, 1886), syn. Raspailia flagelliformis Ridley & Dendy, 1886.
Protosuberites aquaedulcioris (Annandale, 1915), syn. Laxosuberites aquaedulcioris (Annandale, 1915), Suberites aquaedulcioris Annandale, 1914.						
Protosuberites hendricksi Samaai & Gibbons, 2005
Protosuberites reptans (Kirkpatrick, 1903), syn. Amorphinopsis reptans (Kirkpatrick, 1903), Bubaris reptans Kirkpatrick, 1903, Gilchristia reptans (Kirkpatrick, 1903).
Suberites dandelenae Samaai & Maduray, 2017 Amorphous solid sponge
Suberites globosus Carter, 1886 Walled suberite sponge	
Suberites kelleri Burton, 1930, syn. Suberites incrustans Keller, 1891. Crustose suberite sponge	
Suberites stilensis Burton, 1933
Suberites sp. Nardo, 1833 Hermit encrusting sponge

Order Tethyida

Hemiasterellidae
 
Hemiasterella vasiformis var. minor (Kirkpatrick, 1903), syn. Kalastrella vasiformis var. minor Kirkpatrick, 1903.
Hemiasterella vasiformis (Kirkpatrick, 1903), syn. Kalastrella vasiformis Kirkpatrick, 1903.

Tethyidae
 
Halicometes pediculata (Lévi, 1964), syn. Tethycordyla pediculata Lévi, 1964.
Tethya aurantium (Pallas, 1766), syn. Alcyonium aurantium Pallas, 1766, Tethya lyncurium (Linnaeus, 1767), and others probably not relevant.
Tethya magna Kirkpatrick, 1903
Tethya rubra Samaai & Gibbons, 2005 
Tethya sp. 1, hedgehog sponge 
Tethya sp. 2, Prickly pear sponge

Order Tetractinellida
 
Suborder Astrophorina

Family Ancorinidae
 
Ancorina corticata Lévi, 1964				
Ancorina nanosclera Lévi, 1967, syn. Ancorina radix var. nanosclera Lévi, 1967.
Chelotropella sphaerica Lendenfeld, 1907
Dercitus natalensis (Burton, 1926)
Ecionemia baculifera (Kirkpatrick, 1903), syn. Coppatias baculifer Kirkpatrick, 1903.
Ecionemia nigra Sollas, 1888
Jaspis digonoxea (de Laubenfels, 1950), syn. Zaplethea digonoxea de Laubenfels, 1950. Candyfloss sponge
Rhabdastrella actinosa (Lévi, 1964), syn. Aurora actinosa Lévi, 1964.						
Rhabdastrella primitiva (Burton, 1926), syn. Aurora primitiva Burton, 1926.
Rhabdastrella spinosa (Lévi, 1967), syn. Aurora spinosa Lévi, 1967.
Stelletta agulhana Lendenfeld, 1907 globular sponge, grey wall sponge
Stelletta agulhana var. paucistella Burton, 1926
Stelletta capensis Lévi, 1967
Stelletta cyathioides Burton, 1926						
Stelletta farcimen Lendenfeld, 1907
Stelletta grubii Schmidt, 1862, syn. Stelletta anceps Schmidt, 1868, Collingsia sarniensis Gray, 1867, Ecionemia coactura Bowerbank, 1874, Stelletta collingsi (Bowerbank, 1866), Tethea collingsii Bowerbank, 1866, Tethea schmidtii Bowerbank, 1866.
Stelletta grubioides Burton, 1926
Stelletta herdmani Dendy, 1905						
Stelletta horrens Kirkpatrick, 1902
Stelletta horrens var. subcylindrica Burton, 1926
Stelletta purpurea Ridley, 1884, syn. Stelletta purpurea var. parvistella Ridley, 1884.					
Stelletta retroclada (Lévi, 1967), syn. Myriastra retroclada Lévi, 1967.
Stelletta rugosa Burton, 1926
Stelletta sphaerica Burton, 1926
Stelletta trisclera Lévi, 1967
Stryphnus ponderosus (Bowerbank, 1866), syn. Ecionemia ponderosa Bowerbank, 1866.
Stryphnus progressus (Lendenfeld, 1907), syn. Ancorina progressa Lendenfeld, 1907.
Stryphnus unguiculus Sollas, 1886

Family Geodiidae
 
Erylus amorphus Burton, 1926
Erylus gilchristi Burton, 1926
Erylus polyaster Lendenfeld, 1907
Pachymatisma areolata Bowerbank, 1872
Pachymatisma monaena Lendenfeld, 1907

Subfamily Erylinae
Penares alata (Lendenfeld, 1907), syn. Pachamphilla alata Lendenfeld, 1907.
Penares obtusus Lendenfeld, 1907
Penares sphaera (Lendenfeld, 1907), syn. Papyrula sphaera Lendenfeld, 1907. Crater sponge

Subfamily Geodiinae
Geodia basilea Lévi, 1964
Geodia dendyi Burton, 1926, syn.Geodia (Isops) dendyi Burton, 1926.
Geodia gallica (Lendenfeld, 1907), syn. Isops gallica Lendenfeld, 1907.
Geodia globosa (Baer, 1906), syn. Sidonops globosa Baer, 1906.
Geodia labyrinthica (Kirkpatrick, 1903), syn. Placospongia labyrinthica Kirkpatrick, 1903.
Geodia libera Stephens, 1915					
Geodia littoralis Stephens, 1915						
Geodia megaster Burton, 1926
Geodia ovifractus var.cyathioides Burton, 1926, syn. Geodia (Isops) ovifractus var. cyathioides Burton, 1926.
Geodia ovifractus Burton, 1926
Geodia perarmata Bowerbank, 1873
Geodia robusta Lendenfeld, 1907
Geodia stellata Lendenfeld, 1907

Family Macandrewiidae
 
Macandrewia auris Lendenfeld, 1907

Family Pachastrellidae
 
Pachastrella caliculata Kirkpatrick, 1902
Pachastrella monilifera Schmidt, 1868
Triptolemma incertum (Kirkpatrick, 1903)

Family Vulcanellidae
 
Poecillastra compressa (Bowerbank, 1866), syn. Ecionemia compressa Bowerbank, 1866, Hymeniacidon placentula Bowerbank, 1874, Normania crassa Bowerbank, 1874, Pachastrella compressa (Bowerbank, 1866), Pachastrella stylifera Lendenfeld, 1897, Pachastrella tenuipilosa Lendenfeld, 1907, Poecillastra scabra (Schmidt, 1868), Stelletta scabra Schmidt, 1868.
Poecillastra tenuirhabda (Lendenfeld, 1907), syn.Chelotropaena tenuirhabda Lendenfeld, 1907.
Poecillastra tuberosa (Lévi, 1964), syn. Characella tuberosa Lévi, 1964.

Suborder Spirophorina

Family Scleritodermidae
 
Microscleroderma hirsutum Kirkpatrick, 1903, syn. Amphibleptula hirsuta (Kirkpatrick, 1903).

Family Siphonidiidae
 
Gastrophanella mammilliformis Burton, 1929
Lithobactrum forte Kirkpatrick, 1903

Family Tetillidae
 
Cinachyrella hamata (Lendenfeld, 1907), syn. Cinachyra hamata Lendenfeld, 1907.
Craniella cranium f. microspira Lévi, 1967
Craniella metaclada (Lendenfeld, 1907), syn. Tetilla metaclada (Lendfeld, 1907), Tethyopsilla metaclada Lendenfeld, 1907.
Craniella zetlandica (Carter, 1872), syn. Tetilla zetlandica (Carter, 1872), Tethyopsilla zetlandica (Carter, 1872), Tethya zetlandica Carter, 1872, Craniellopsis zetlandica (Carter, 1872).
Tetilla bonaventuraKirkpatrick, 1902
Tetilla capillosa Lévi, 1967 Furry sponge					
Tetilla casula (Carter, 1871), syn. Tethya casula Carter, 1871, Casula casula (Carter, 1871). Volcano sponge
Tetilla pedonculata Lévi, 1967

Family Theonellidae
 
Discodermia natalensis Kirkpatrick, 1903
Theonella conica (Kieschnick, 1896), syn. Discodermia conica Kieschnick, 1896. Conical sponge

Family Thoosidae
 
Alectona wallichii (Carter, 1874), syn. Gummina wallichii Carter,  1874.

Order Trachycladida

Family Trachycladidae
 
Trachycladus spinispirulifer (Carter, 1879), syn, Spirastrella dilatata Kieschnick, 1896, Spirastrella spinispirulifera (Carter, 1879), Suberites spinispirulifer Carter, 1879. Orange wall sponge, Encrusting solid sponge

Subclass Keratosa

Order Dendroceratida

Family Darwinellidae

Darwinella warreni Topsent, 1905

Order Dictyoceratida

Family Dysideidae

Dysidea cinerea Keller, 1889, syn. Spongelia cinerea (Keller, 1889).
Dysidea fragilis (Montagu, 1814), syn. Spongelia fistularis Schmidt, 1864.

Family Irciniidae

Ircinia aruensis (Hentschel, 1912), syn. Hippospongia aruensis (Hentschel, 1912), Hircinia aruensis Hentschel, 1912.
Ircinia ramosa (Keller, 1889), syn. Hircinia ramosa Keller, 1889, Hippospongia frondosa Hentschel, 1912.
Psammocinia arenosa (Lendenfeld, 1888), syn. Hircinia arenosa Lendenfeld, 1888.
Sarcotragus australis (Lendenfeld, 1888), syn. Ircinia arbuscula (Lendenfeld, 1889), Hircinia australis Lendenfeld, 1888, Hircinia arbuscula Lendenfeld, 1889. Black stink sponge

Family Spongiidae

Leiosella caliculata Lendenfeld, 1889

Family Thorectidae
 
Subfamily Thorectinae
Fascaplysinopsis reticulata (Hentschel, 1912), syn. Aplysinopsis reticulata Hentschel, 1912. Goose bump sponge

Subclass Verongimorpha

Order Chondrillida

Family Chondrillidae

Chondrilla australiensis Carter, 1873, syn. Chondrillastra australiensis (Carter, 1873), Chondrilla ternatensis Thiele, 1900, Chondrilla papillata Lendenfeld, 1885, Chondrilla globulifera Keller, 1891, Chondrilla corticata Lendenfeld, 1885, Chondrilla australiensis var. lobata Dendy, 1905.

Order Verongiida

Family Aplysinellidae

Suberea pedunculata (Lévi, 1969), syn. Verongia pedunculata Lévi, 1969.

Family Aplysinidae

Aplysina capensis Carter, 1875

Family Ianthellidae

Hexadella kirkpatricki Burton, 1926

Class Hexactinellida

Subclass Amphidiscophora

Order Amphidiscosida

Family Hyalonematidae

Hyalonema (Cyliconema) abyssale (Lévi, 1964), syn. Cyliconema abyssale Lévi, 1964.
Lophophysema gilchristi Tabachnick & Lévi, 1999

Subclass Hexasterophora

Order Aulocalycoida

Family Aulocalycidae

Subfamily Aulocalycinae
Aulocalyx irregularis Schulze, 1886

Order Lyssacinosida

Family Rossellidae

Rossella cf. antarctica Carter, 1872 Glass sponge
Subfamily Lanuginellinae
Caulophacus (Caulophacus) basispinosus Lévi, 1964, syn. Caulophacus basispinosus Lévi, 1964.	
Caulophacus (Caulophacus) galatheae Lévi, 1964, syn. Caulophacus galatheae Lévi, 1964.	
Caulophacus (Caulophacus) latus Schulze, 1886, syn. Caulophacus latus Schulze, 1886.					
Ceratopsion microxephora (Kirkpatrick, 1903), syn. Phakellia microxephora Kirkpatrick, 1903.

Family Rossellidae

Subfamily Acanthascinae
Rhabdocalyptus baculifer Schulze, 1904, syn. Acanthascus (Rhabdocalyptus) baculifer (Schulze, 1904), Acanthascus baculifer (Schulze, 1904).
Rhabdocalyptus plumodigitatus Kirkpatrick, 1901, syn. Acanthascus (Rhabdocalyptus) plumodigitatus (Kirkpatrick, 1901) Acanthascus plumodigitatus (Kirkpatrick, 1901).

Subfamily Lanuginellinae
Sympagella johnstoni (Schulze, 1886), syn. Aulascus johnstoni Schulze, 1886. 

Subfamily Rossellinae
Crateromorpha (Crateromorpha) lankesteri Kirkpatrick, 1902

Family Euplectellidae

Subfamily Corbitellinae
Regadrella phoenix Schmidt, 1880, syn. Regadrella peru Tabachnick, 1990.

Notes

References

Marine biodiversity of South Africa
South Africa
South African animal biodiversity lists